The 2008 Twenty20 Cup was the sixth running of the tournament, and saw Middlesex Crusaders winning the tournament after a thrilling climax to the final against the reigning champions, the Kent Spitfires. The tournament began on 11 June 2008 before culminating in Finals Day, held at The Rose Bowl, Southampton on 26 July.  As always, the eighteen county sides were split into three groups of six, depending on the location of the counties in the United Kingdom.

Group stage

Tables

Midlands/West/Wales Division

North Division 

1 The match on 27 June between Nottinghamshire and Yorkshire had no points awarded after it was found that Yorkshire had fielded an ineligible player for the match; Yorkshire were also ejected from the competition.

South Division

Knockout stage

Note: The draw for the semi-finals occurred after the quarter-finals.

Quarter-finals 

The match at the Riverside was postponed in bizarre circumstances. The ECB received allegations about Yorkshire fielding an ineligible player in their final group game, against the Nottinghamshire Outlaws.

In an original meeting on 10 July, Yorkshire were summoned to Old Trafford and were told that they were to be ejected from the tournament, with Nottinghamshire to be reinstated in the draw. However, Yorkshire appealed and at a second meeting held on 14 July, their appeal was heard and rejected, but this time Glamorgan were placed into the draw on a superior run rate, because Nottinghamshire were not awarded the points for the 27 June game.

Having waited fifteen days to play their quarter-final, Durham progressed to Finals Day after a 44-run win at the Riverside. Having been put into bat, the visitors took three early wickets, removing dangermen Phil Mustard, Shivnarine Chanderpaul and Paul Collingwood, with the score only on 26. After Michael Di Venuto fell, Durham looked to be in some trouble. However, a fifth wicket partnership of 53 between Will Smith and captain Dale Benkenstein pushed the score up. Smith made 51 as Durham set a target of 164, for Glamorgan to chase. It could have been somewhat lower had it not been for virtuoso innings by Gareth Breese, smashing 20 off just 9 balls, and Liam Plunkett who hit 12* off 3. James Harris took 3 wickets, but accounted for around a quarter of the runs conceded.

The Glamorgan reply could not have gotten off to a worse start, losing opener Richard Grant very first ball. David Hemp soon followed, becoming Plunkett's second victim, with only seven runs on the board. Glamorgan were always struggling with the run-rate, with most of the top-order recording strike rates of below 100. Only four players made it to double figures, with Jamie Dalrymple top scoring with 32, and had stern support from wicket-keeper Mark Wallace, who fired 26 off sixteen deliveries. However, Glamorgan fell a long way short with Plunkett, the pick of the Durham attack, taking 3-16 off three overs.

Finals Day 

Semi-finals

Final

Statistics

Runs

Wickets

See also
2008 Twenty20 Cup Finals Day
2008 English cricket season

References

External links 
 Cricinfo
 BBC Sport

 
Twenty20 Cup
Twenty20 Cup